The Left Faction (Siat Smol) was a short-lived political party in Israel.

History
The Left Faction was formed on 20 February 1952 (during the second Knesset) as a breakaway from Mapam in the aftermath of the Prague Trials. The show trials in which mostly Jewish leaders of the Communist Party of Czechoslovakia were purged, falsely implicated Mapam's envoy in Prague, Mordechai Oren, as part of a Zionist conspiracy. This, and later Nikita Khrushchev's Secret Speech at the 20th Party Congress in the Soviet Union, led to Mapam moving away from some of their more radical left wing positions, and towards social democracy.

Unhappy with the move, several Mapam MKs left the party; Moshe Aram, Yisrael Bar-Yehuda, Yitzhak Ben-Aharon and Aharon Zisling set up Ahdut HaAvoda-Poale Zion, Hannah Lamdan and David Livschitz created the Faction independent of Ahdut HaAvoda, whilst Rostam Bastuni (the first Israeli Arab MK representing a Zionist party), Adolf Berman and Moshe Sneh established the Left Faction.

However, the party ceased to exist on 1 November 1954 when Bastuni returned to Mapam and Berman and Sneh joined the communist party, Maki.

References

External links
Party history Knesset website

Political parties established in 1952
Defunct political parties in Israel
Zionist political parties in Israel
Political parties disestablished in 1954
Labor Zionism
1952 establishments in Israel